was the twenty-fourth of the fifty-three stations of the Tōkaidō. It is located in what is now part of Shimada, Shizuoka Prefecture, Japan. During the Edo period, it was the easternmost post station of Tōtōmi Province.

History
Kanaya-juku was built up on the right bank of the Ōi River across from Shimada-juku. There were over 1,000 buildings in the post town, including three honjin, one sub-honjin and 51 hatago. However, whenever the river's banks overflowed, travelers were not able to pass through Kanaya and on to Shimada-juku, as the Tokugawa shogunate had expressly forbidden the construction of any bridge on the Ōi River.

The classic ukiyo-e print by Andō Hiroshige (Hōeido edition) from 1831–1834 depicts a daimyō procession on sankin-kōtai crossing the river. The daimyō is riding in a kago, held above the water by a makeshift platform carried by numerous porters. His retainers are attempting to wade across the river. In the background, a small village is shown in the foothills.

Neighboring post towns
Tōkaidō
Shimada-juku - Kanaya-juku - Nissaka-shuku

Further reading
Carey, Patrick. Rediscovering the Old Tokaido:In the Footsteps of Hiroshige. Global Books UK (2000). 
Chiba, Reiko. Hiroshige's Tokaido in Prints and Poetry. Tuttle. (1982) 
Taganau, Jilly. The Tokaido Road: Travelling and Representation in Edo and Meiji Japan. RoutledgeCurzon (2004).

References

Stations of the Tōkaidō
Stations of the Tōkaidō in Shizuoka Prefecture